Lahn-Dill is an electoral constituency (German: Wahlkreis) represented in the Bundestag. It elects one member via first-past-the-post voting. Under the current constituency numbering system, it is designated as constituency 172. It is located in western Hesse, comprising the Lahn-Dill-Kreis district and a small part of the Gießen district.

Lahn-Dill was created for the inaugural 1949 federal election. Since 2021, it has been represented by Dagmar Schmidt of the Social Democratic Party (SPD).

Geography
Lahn-Dill is located in western Hesse. As of the 2021 federal election, it comprises the Lahn-Dill-Kreis district and the municipalities of Biebertal and Wettenberg from the Gießen district.

History
Lahn-Dill was created in 1949, then known as Wetzlar. It acquired its current name in the 1980 election. In the 1949 election, it was Hesse constituency 7 in the numbering system. In the 1953 through 1976 elections, it was number 132. From 1980 through 1998, it was number 130. In 2002 and 2005, it was number 174. In the 2009 election, it was number 173. Since 2013, it has been number 172.

Originally, the constituency comprised the districts of Wetzlar and Dillkreis. In the 1980 through 1998 elections, it comprised the Lahn-Dill-Kreis district as well as, from the Gießen district, the municipalities of Biebertal and Wettenberg and the Stadtteil of Lützellinden from Gießen municipality. In the 2002 election, it lost the Stadtteil of Lützellinden.

Members
The constituency was first represented by Karl Gaul of the Free Democratic Party (FDP) from 1949 to 1953. Wilhelm Reitz of the Social Democratic Party (SPD) was elected in 1953 and served until 1969. He was succeeded by fellow SPD members Helmut Kater until 1976 and Klaus Daubertshäuser until 1983. Christian Lenzer of the Christian Democratic Union (CDU) was elected in 1983, but former member Daubertshäuser regained the constituency in 1987 and served a further two terms. He was succeeded by fellow party member Erika Lotz in 1994, who served until 2002. Helga Lopez of the SPD served from 2005 to 2009, when Sibylle Pfeiffer of the CDU won the constituency. She was succeeded by Hans-Jürgen Irmer in 2017. Dagmar Schmidt regained it for the SPD in 2021.

Election results

2021 election

2017 election

2013 election

2009 election

References

Federal electoral districts in Hesse
1949 establishments in West Germany
Constituencies established in 1949
Lahn-Dill-Kreis
Giessen (district)